Li Zhen (born 26 February 1985 in Ma'anshan, Anhui) is a Chinese sprint canoer who competed in the late 2000s. He finished seventh in the K-4 1000 m event at the 2008 Summer Olympics in Beijing.

References

Sports-Reference.com profile

1985 births
Living people
People from Ma'anshan
Sportspeople from Anhui
Olympic canoeists of China
Canoeists at the 2008 Summer Olympics
Asian Games medalists in canoeing
Canoeists at the 2006 Asian Games
Chinese male canoeists
Medalists at the 2006 Asian Games
Asian Games gold medalists for China
Asian Games bronze medalists for China